The 1968 Swedish speedway season was the 1968 season of motorcycle speedway in Sweden.

Individual

Individual Championship
The 1968 Swedish Individual Speedway Championship final was held on 13 September in Stockholm. Leif Enecrona won the Swedish Championship.

Junior Championship
 
Winner - Hans Johansson

Team

Team Championship
Kaparna won division 1 and were declared the winners of the Swedish Speedway Team Championship. The Kaparna team included Ove Fundin and Göte Nordin.

Lejonen won the second division and Dackarna and Filbyterna won the third division east and west respectively.

See also 
 Speedway in Sweden

References

Speedway leagues
Professional sports leagues in Sweden
Swedish
Seasons in Swedish speedway